Hyencourt-le-Grand is a former commune in the Somme department in Hauts-de-France in northern France. On 1 January 2017, it was merged into the new commune Hypercourt.

Geography

History
The first reference to the village of Hyencourt-le-Grand occurs during the Middle Ages when a château was built here. All that remains of the château is the chapel of Saint-Léger, rebuilt after the First World War and restored by local people in 2005.
Buried beneath the village is a World War I military hospital. Occasional subsidence indicates its presence.

Population

See also
Communes of the Somme department

References

Former communes of Somme (department)
Populated places disestablished in 2017